The Tahiti crake (Zapornia nigra), also known as Miller's rail, was a species of bird in the family Rallidae.
It was endemic to Tahiti. It was discovered and painted by Georg Forster during the second Cook voyage. John Frederick Miller copied Forster's painting and published it with some changes and remarks in his work Cimelia Physica in 1784. It probably went extinct in about 1800 from introduced predators.

References

Zapornia
Controversial bird taxa
Extinct birds of Oceania
Birds described in 1784
Taxa named by John Frederick Miller
Taxonomy articles created by Polbot
†